Iolaus henryi is a butterfly in the family Lycaenidae. It is found in south-western Uganda and Tanzania. The habitat consists of forest.

References

Butterflies described in 1961
Iolaus (butterfly)